The Herald Sun Aria, formerly known as The Sun Aria (because it was sponsored by The Sun News-Pictorial) is a vocal competition for emerging opera singers held in Victoria, Australia, each year. The competition offers nearly $60,000 in cash prizes.

The competition forms the aria section of the Royal South Street Eisteddfod, Australia's oldest and largest eisteddfod.

Three of the most famous past winners of the Aria competition are Wagnerian soprano Marjorie Lawrence (1928) and Dames Malvina Major (1964) and Kiri Te Kanawa in 1965. Other previous winners include June Bronhill (1950), Jonathan Summers (1973), Judith Henley (1976), Suzanne Ward (1984), Linda Thompson (1990), Rachelle Durkin (2000), and Nicole Car (2007).

The heats (generally two) of the competition are held annually in September at Her Majesty's Theatre, and the final is held at Hamer Hall in the Arts Centre Melbourne in early November. Finalists are accompanied by Orchestra Victoria, conducted by Maestro Richard Divall AO, OBE.

The competition has a panel of three adjudicators, and Richard Divall has been a panel member since 2001. The other adjudicators in 2014 were Roxane Hislop and Tiffany Speight.

Contestants, who are aged 32 years or under, are required to submit four arias from grand opera prior to the competition, and choose one of these to sing in the heat.

Sixteen semi-finalists are selected from those singing in the heats to appear on the evening following the second heat, again at Her Majesty's Theatre and sing another aria, this time chosen from their list by the panel of adjudicators.

Five finalists are then chosen to compete in the final at Hamer Hall.

References

Music competitions in Australia
Ballarat
Sun Aria
Opera competitions
Recurring events established in 1924